Bruce Wayne Bastian (born on March 23, 1948) is an American computer programmer and businessperson.  He co-founded the WordPerfect Software Company with Alan Ashton in 1978 (originally known as Satellite Software International and then changed to WordPerfect Corporation in 1982).

Early life and education
Bastian was born on March 23, 1948, in Twin Falls, Idaho. He attended college at Brigham Young University (BYU) in Provo, Utah, where he initially majored in music. While serving as the director of the BYU Cougar Marching Band, Bastian developed a software program to help choreograph marching band performances with the help of instructor Alan Ashton. After leaving his position with the marching band, he then went on to earn his master's degree in computer science.

Career
Upon graduating in the spring of 1978, Bastian briefly worked for Ashton and another partner, developing word processing software.  When that company shut down due to inadequate funding, Bastian took a job with the Eyring Research Institute (ERI).  At ERI, Bastian briefly worked on a language translation program (unrelated to WordPerfect).  Within a few months of his employment at ERI, the company signed a contract with Orem City, Utah, to produce a word processor for the city's new DEC PDP-11/34 mini computer.  Since Bastian was the only employee at ERI who had a development experience with word processing, the company contracted with Bastian and Ashton to develop what would become WordPerfect. Originally the word processor was written in DEC Assembler Language.  It was later ported to the IBM PC.

In 2010, in honor of Bastian's long-term commitment to the arts, President Barack Obama appointed him to the Presidential Advisory Committee of the Arts.

References

External links
B.W. Bastian Foundation
Philanthropist and WordPerfect Co-Founder Bruce Bastian, Interview on Mormon Stories

1948 births
Living people
20th-century Mormon missionaries
American computer scientists
American Mormon missionaries in Italy
Brigham Young University alumni
Engineers from Idaho
Former Latter Day Saints
American LGBT businesspeople
LGBT Latter Day Saints
LGBT people from Idaho
People from Twin Falls, Idaho